The Ronne Antarctic Research Expedition (RARE) was an expedition from 1947–1948 which researched the area surrounding the head of the Weddell Sea in Antarctica.

Background
Finn Ronne led the RARE which was the final privately sponsored expedition from the United States and explored and mapped the last unknown coastline on earth and determined that the Weddell Sea and the Ross Sea were not connected.  The expedition included Isaac Schlossbach, as second in command, who was to have Cape Schlossbach named after him. The expedition, based out of Stonington Island was the first to take women to over-winter. Ronne's wife, Edith Ronne was correspondent for the North American Newspaper Alliance for expedition and the chief pilot Darlington took his wife.

Partial Listing of Discoveries

  Mount Abrams -  Named for Talbert Abrams, noted photogrammetric engineer
  Mount Becker - Named for Ralph A. Becker, legal counsel who assisted in the formation of RARE
  Mount Brundage - Named for Burr Brundage, U.S. Department of State, who assisted in making arrangements for the expedition 
  English Coast- Named for Capt. Robert A.J. English, USN, Executive Secretary of the USAS
  Sweeney Mountains - Named for Mrs. Edward C. Sweeney, a contributor to the expedition
  Behrendt Mountains - Named for John C. Behrendt, traverse seismologist at Ellsworth Station
  Merrick Mountains - Named for Conrad G. Merrick, USGS topographic engineer
  Gardner Inlet - Named  for Irvine Gardner, physicist at the National Bureau of Standards
  Thuronyi Bluff - Named for Géza Thuronyi, an Antarctic scholar at the Library of Congress
  Wetmore Glacier - Named  for Alexander Wetmore, Secretary of the Smithsonian Institution
  Irvine Glacier - Named  for George J. Irvine, of the Engineer Depot at Fort Belvoir, Virginia
  Quilty Nunataks - Named for Patrick Quilty, geologist with the University of Wisconsin–Madison
  Mount Coman - Named for Dr. F. Dana Coman, physician with the Byrd Antarctic Expedition
  Haag Nunataks - Named for Joseph Haag, head of Todd Pacific Shipyards
  Ewing Island - Named for Dr. Maurice Ewing, Columbia University, assisted in planning  RARE
  Cape Adams - Named for Lt. Charles J. Adams of the then USAAF, pilot with the expedition
  Bowman Peninsula - Named  for Isaiah Bowman, American geographer.
  Orville Coast - Named for Capt. Howard T. Orville, USN, Head of the Naval Aerological Service
  Ketchum Glacier - Named for Cdr. Gerald Ketchum, USN, commander of the Burton Island
  Mount Austin (Antarctica) - Named for Stephen F. Austin, American colonizer in Texas
  Mount Edward - Named for Cdr. Edward C. Sweeney, USNR, a contributor to the expedition
  Mount Owen (Antarctica) - Named for Arthur Owen, a member of the Ronne Antarctic Research Expedition

See also
List of Antarctic expeditions
Theodore Roosevelt McElroy
Antarctic Conquest

References

External links
Expedition map
Ronne Antarctic Research Expedition

History of Antarctica
United States and the Antarctic
1947 in the United States
1947 in Antarctica
1948 in Antarctica
Antarctic expeditions
Expeditions from the United States